Princess Elizaveta Ostrogska (1539–1582), also known as Elżbieta or Halshka, was a Ruthenian heiress, the only child of Prince Illia Ostrogski and Beata Kościelecka.

Biography
She wasn born in the Ostrog castle in 1539, soon after her father died. She inherited a great fortune which made her appealing as a bride for potential husbands.

When she was 14, her uncle Konstanty Wasyl Ostrogski (against the will of her mother) made her marry Dymitr Sanguszko, starost of Kaniv, Cherkasy and Zhytomyr. Soon Dymitr needed to flee because of Infamy and conflict with Sigismund II Augustus I, but he was captured and killed by Marcin Zborowski in the Jaroměř in 1554.

In 1555 the King made her marry Łukasz Górka, voivode of Poznań, Kalisz, Łęczyca and Brześć Kujawski again against her and her mother's will, who wanted Halszka to marry Siemion Olelkowicz, Prince of Slutsk. Both mother and daughter fled to Lviv and hid in the Dominican Church. Prince Siemon slipped into the church dressed like a beggar and secretly married Princess Ostrozka in 1559. The King however didn't recognize it and ordered Prince Siemon to give Elizaveta back to Górka. The church was besieged, and mother and daughter were forced to surrender and accept the King's will.

Her mother, Beata Kościelecka, for many years tried to cancel the marriage with Łukasz Górka. In the meantime, Prince Siemion Olelkovycz Slutski died. When he died, Elizaveta started to participate in social affairs with her husband de jure.

Elżbieta lived with Górka in his castle in Szamotuły until his death in January 1573.

When she became a widow for the third time, her uncle Konstanty Wasyl made her give him and his son Janusz part of her fortune.

She died alone, insane, at the age of 43 in 1582.

Inspirations
Her tragic fate was a base for the book of Józef Ignacy Kraszewski, titled Halszka (Wilno 1838).

Jan Matejko pictured her in the background of Kazanie Skargi.

There is a legend about one of the Szamotuły castle towers, that it was the prison for a "dark princess", whose face was hidden behind an iron mask by her husband.

See also

House of Ostrogski
Lithuanian nobility
List of szlachta

References

External links
 Lubomyr Wynar. Ostrozky in the Encyclopedia of Ukraine, vol. 3 (1993)

Polish princesses
Elzbieta Ostrozka
1539 births
1582 deaths
People from Ostroh
16th-century Polish landowners
16th-century Polish women
16th-century Polish nobility